W Radio is the branding of several radio stations, including:
W Radio México, see XEW-AM
W Radio Los Angeles, see XEWW-AM
W Radio (Colombia)
Caracol Miami, see WSUA